Breadnut may refer to:

 Brosimum alicastrum, also known as "Maya nut" or ramón, theorized to be a staple crop for the ancient Maya
 Artocarpus camansi, a close relative of the breadfruit